Golden Hits is the first compilation album by the American rock band the Turtles. It was released on White Whale Records.

Track listing

Side 1
"You Baby" (P.F. Sloan, Steve Barri) – 2:19 (from You Baby)
"So Goes Love" (Gerry Goffin, Carole King) – 2:37 (non-single LP debut)
"She'd Rather Be with Me (Gary Bonner, Alan Gordon) – 2:17 (from Happy Together)
"Is It Any Wonder" (Kaylan) – 2:28 (non-single LP debut)
"Let Me Be" (Sloan) – 2:20 (from It Ain't Me Babe)
"Grim Reaper of Love" (Al Nichol, Chuck Portz) – 2:45 (from White Whale single 231)

Side 2
"It Ain't Me Babe" (Bob Dylan) – 2:10 (from It Ain't Me Babe)
"Can I Get To Know You Better" (Sloan, Barri) – 2:32 (from White Whale single 238)
"Happy Together" (Bonner, Gordon) – 2:50 (from Happy Together)
"Outside Chance" (Glenn Crocker, Warren Zevon) – 2:02 (from White Whale single 234)
"You Know What I Mean" (Bonner, Gordon) – 2:38 (from White Whale single 254)

1967 greatest hits albums
The Turtles albums
White Whale Records compilation albums